The Illawarra Steam Navigation Company serviced the south coast of New South Wales between 1858 and 1955. During this period they owned over 20 vessels, ranging from riverboats to the 1111 ton passenger vessel, Merimbula.

References

Illawara